Eunotosaurus (Latin: Stout-backed lizard) is an extinct genus of amniote, possibly a close relative of turtles. Eunotosaurus lived in the late Middle Permian (Capitanian stage) and fossils can be found in the Karoo Supergroup of South Africa. Eunotosaurus resided in the swamps of southern Africa. Its ribs were wide and flat, forming broad plates similar to a primitive turtle shell, and the vertebrae were nearly identical to those of some turtles. Accordingly, it is often considered as a possible transitional fossil between turtles and their prehistoric ancestors. However, it is possible that these turtle-like features evolved independently of the same features in turtles, since other anatomical studies and phylogenetic analyses suggest that Eunotosaurus may instead have been a parareptile, an early-diverging neodiapsid unrelated to turtles, or a synapsid.

Description

It had a broad body formed by nine pairs of widened ribs that overlap each other. The forward-most ribs are angled slightly backward and the backward-most ribs angle slightly forward. The ribs are T-shaped in cross section, each having a broad, flat surface on the top and a narrow ridge running along its length on the bottom. The upper surface is convex, giving the body of Eunotosaurus a rounded shape. Each pair of ribs connects to an elongated dorsal or back vertebra. Most ribs are fused to the vertebrae, but some smaller specimens of Eunotosaurus have rib pairs that connect with the vertebrae but are not fused to them. There are nine dorsal vertebrae, far fewer than what is seen in other parareptiles. The neck of Eunotosaurus is short, consisting of six short cervical vertebrae.

Histological analysis of cross-sections of the ribs indicate that they grew in three different phases as an individual developed. As is the case in most land vertebrates, the first phase involves the growth of a rib primordium that ossifies into a rib bone. The second phase, which deviates from most other land vertebrates, is the development of a shelf of bone above the main shaft of the rib to form the T-shape. The third and final phase is the widening of the lower ridge into a teardrop-like shape, reinforcing the rib. While the third phase is unique to Eunotosaurus, the second phase is also seen in modern turtles. In turtles, the shelf of bone that forms from the rib shaft becomes a plate of the shell or carapace. In each rib of Eunotosaurus, the posterior surface of the lower ridge has Sharpey's fibers embedded in it. Sharpey's fibers help anchor muscles to bone. Most amniotes have Sharpey's fibers on the posterior and anterior edges of the ribs because the ribs are connected to each other by intercostal muscles, which are muscles that assist in breathing. The lack of Sharpey's fibers on the anterior side of the ribs of Eunotosaurus suggests that it lacked functional intercostal muscles. Turtles also lack intercostal muscles and instead have muscles that connect to the undersides of the ribs for the purpose of locomotion. If Eunotosaurus is close to the ancestry of turtles, it may have had similar sets of muscles.

History of study
Eunotosaurus was named in 1892, but it was not until 1914 that it was proposed to be an ancestor of Chelonia, the turtle order. English zoologist D. M. S. Watson claimed that Eunotosaurus was transitional between cotylosaurs (now referred to as captorhinids) and Chelonia. He compared it to "Archichelone", a name he devised for a hypothetical chelonian ancestor, noting that its ribs appeared to be intermediate between those of turtles and other tetrapods. Watson's "Archichelone" had a pelvic girdle that was pushed back on the vertebral column and placed under the shell. However, fossils of Eunotosaurus show that the pelvis is in the normal tetrapod position and is placed over the ribs rather than within them, as in modern turtles. Many fossils have been found showing a semi-rigid, turtle-like rib cage, one which presumably necessitated a tortoise-like fashion of walking.

Eunotosaurus was considered the ancestor of turtles up until the late 1940s. In his 1956 book Osteology of the Reptiles, American paleontologist Alfred Sherwood Romer claimed that Eunotosaurus could not be included within Chelonia based on the available evidence. He placed it within Anapsida in its own order incertae sedis.

Over a century after its naming, Eunotosaurus was known from less than a dozen specimens, with very little material known from the skull. Despite the paucity of material, it was well described. Two additional skeletons were unearthed from the Karoo Supergroup and described in 1999. They are now housed in the Bernard Price Institute for Palaeontological Research in Johannesburg and the National Museum, Bloemfontein. While relatively rare, Eunotosaurus is common enough in the Karoo to be used as a biostratigraphic marker. It is present in the upper Tapinocephalus Assemblage Zone and in all parts of the succeeding Pristerognathus Assemblage Zone.

Classification
The ribs of Eunotosaurus were very wide and flat, touching each other to form broad plates similar to the carapace of a turtle. Moreover, the number of vertebrae, the size of the vertebrae, and their structure are nearly identical to those of some turtles. Despite its many similarities to turtles, Eunotosaurus has a skull that shares many characteristics with the skulls of more primitive reptiles, resulting in many studies placing it in the extinct group Parareptilia. Phylogenetic analyses that use only the physical features of fossils and living species to determine evolutionary relationships have often shown strong support for both Eunotosaurus and turtles being descendants of parareptiles, in which case Eunotosaurus. However, analyses which also include genetic data from living reptiles strongly support the idea that turtles fall within a group called Diapsida, as close relatives of either lizards (in which case they would be lepidosauromorphs) or birds and crocodiles (making them archosauromorphs). According to this view, the expanded ribs and similar vertebral columns of Eunotosaurus and turtles may be a case of evolutionary convergence. However, the discovery of Pappochelys, a prehistoric species whose fossil remains show a mixture of features found in Eunotosaurus and the toothed stem-turtle Odontochelys, helped to resolve the issue. Though an analysis which included data from Pappochelys found weak support for the idea that Eunotosaurus was a parareptile, it found stronger support for the hypothesis that Eunotosaurus was itself a diapsid closely related to turtles, and that its apparently primitive, anapsid skull was probably developed as part of the turtle lineage, independently of parareptiles.

Eunotosaurus was assigned to its own family, Eunotosauridae, in 1954. However, this name has fallen into disuse. In 1969, it was placed in the parareptile suborder Captorhinomorpha, which is now considered to be within the clade Eureptilia. In 2000, Eunotosaurus was placed in the clade Parareptilia, separate from turtles and cotylosaurs. A 2008 phylogenetic analysis of parareptiles found Eunotosaurus to be the sister taxon of Milleretta and thus within the family Millerettidae.

Eunotosaurus was incorporated in a recent 2010 phylogenetic analysis that sought to determine the origin of turtles. Turtles have recently been considered diapsids on the basis of genetic and phylogenetic evidence, and thus more closely related to modern lizards, snakes, crocodiles, and birds than parareptiles. However, with the inclusion of Eunotosaurus and the Late Triassic stem turtle Proganochelys, the resulting phylogenetic tree placed turtles outside Diapsida in a position similar to turtle's original placement as parareptiles. This study claimed that Eunotosaurus shared derived features of its ribs and vertebrae with the earliest turtles, thus making it a transitional form. The study identified several features that united Eunotosaurus with turtles in a true clade. These include broad T-shaped ribs, ten elongated trunk vertebrae, cranial tubercles (small projections on the surface of the skull), and a wide trunk. The clade consisting of Eunotosaurus and turtles was called Pan-Testudines (defined as all animals more closely related to turtles than to any other living group). More derived pan-testudines, such as the earliest turtle Odontochelys, have a plastron.

The following cladogram shows the phylogenetic position of the Eunotosaurus, from Ruta et al., 2011.

The cladogram below follows the most likely result found by another analysis of turtle relationships, published by Rainer Schoch and Hans-Dieter Sues in 2015. This study found Eunotosaurus to be an actual early stem-turtle, though other versions of the analysis found weak support for it as a parareptile.

The following cladogram is adapted from a 2022 study by Simões et al. Here, Eunotosaurus was recovered as neither a parareptile or a stem-turtle, but as a basal neodiapsid located outside the reptilian crown group.

References

External links
Eunotosaurus in the Paleobiology Database

Pantestudines
Prehistoric reptile genera
Permian reptiles of Africa
Permian South Africa
Fossils of South Africa
Fossil taxa described in 1892